William Burrough  may refer to:

 William S. Burroughs, American novelist and literary figure
 William Burrough (cricketer), English cricketer

See also
William Borough, British naval officer
William Burroughs (disambiguation)